Dorcadion bisignatum is a species of beetle in the family Cerambycidae. It was described by Jakovlev in 1899. It is known from Turkey.

References

bisignatum
Beetles described in 1899